Mike Saint-Jules (born ) is a Haitian-American DJ and EDM producer from Long Island, New York. Known best for his remixes for artists such as Armin van Buuren, Ferry Corsten, Solarstone, Markus Schulz, and JES.

Early life
Mike began his career as both a Producer and DJ in 2004. He was first introduced to Electronic Dance Music in 2002 via a television documentary, showcasing the sounds of DJ Tiesto. As the years progressed, Mike had gained both his influences and inspirations from Artists like Andy Prinz (Astura), Ferry Corsten, Alex M.O.R.P.H. and Breakfast (Casey Keyworth).

Musical career
In 2008, Mike earned wide praise for his first solo work titled, "Sunlit Clouds", which was released on Dutch Trance Artist Ferry Corsten's "Flashover Recordings". From there, Mike had proved his talents later by having the opportunity to work alongside Artists like Breakfast with their collaborative efforts for tracks titled, "Lifeforms" and "Only Two Should Know".

Notable remixes and collaborations
In 2009, some of Mike's first notable accomplishments were remixing Ferry Corsten's 6th studio album single, "Twice In a Blue Moon" which also saw a vinyl release. Another accomplishment was having the opportunity to collaborate with Filo & Peri for a single on their debut Artist album titled, "Nightplay". The single received massive support from Artists like Paul van Dyk and Armin van Buuren.

In 2013 Mike remixed the track entitled, "Precious" by Armin van Buuren which was a single off his debut Artist album, "76". It was first played by Armin on his world renown radio show, "A State of Trance" Episode 638. The remix was later released on the "A State of Trance 650 New Horizons" CD Box set. It has since then received long lasting support during Armin's live performances throughout the year, including his performance at Ultra Europe in July 2014.

Black Hole Recordings
Mike is currently signed with Black Hole Recordings, where he first signed the Dutch label in 2010 with a track called, "Timeslider" under the Saint X alias. He then moved forward with additional singles under the main imprint and the sub-label imprint, "In Trance We Trust" . Some of the tracks included released are, "Flash Bomb", "The Final Frontier", "The Landing", "Belly of The Beast", and Colour (Feat. Molly Bancroft).

CD compilation
In 2014, Mike was presented the opportunity to be one of three Artists to mix the 20th edition to the "In Trance We Trust" CD compilation in which the series began in 1998. The other Artists who mixed their own respective discs were Dutch Trance Artist Menno de Jong and Irish Trance Artist, Andrew Liggett (aka Sneijder).

DJ performances
In 2006, Mike first started to play in clubs on Long Island and then eventually moved onto other venues based in New York City throughout the years. While not touring, Mike can regularly be seen playing at iconic New York City clubs such Cielo, Pacha, and Webster Hall. Additionally, his recent performances have brought him to cities across the United States such as San Francisco, Miami, Kansas City, Chicago, Philadelphia, Boston, and Washington D.C.

Mike mixes a variety of Electronic Dance Music genres with the ideology of Space related themes and events into his sounds. Mike is primarily classified as Progressive Trance.

References

External links
Mike Saint-Jules Official Website 
Mike Saint-Jules on SoundCloud

Living people
1983 births
People from Huntington, New York
Haitian record producers
Remixers
Haitian DJs